Miguel Mejia may refer to:

 Miguel Mejia (outfielder) (born 1975), Major League Baseball player
 Miguel Mejía (pitcher) (born 1988), Puerto Rican baseball pitcher
 Miguel Mejía (politician), Dominican politician
 Miguel Mejía Barón (born 1949), Mexican footballer and manager
 Miguel Aceves Mejía (1915–2006), Mexican actor, composer and singer